Simone Fautario è un allenatore di calcio ed ex calciatore italiano, di ruolo difensore, tecnico della formazione Under-15 dell'Inter.
Fa tutta la trafila nel settore giovanile dell'Inter ( dai pulcini alla primavera, dove vince anche una coppa Italia e scudetto primavera da capitano).
Esordisce in prima squadra in coppa Italia contro la Sampdoria a San Siro con Mancini allenatore.
Una volta uscito dal settore giovanile inizia la carriera da professionista(Prosesto,Pistoiese,Grosseto,Como,Frosinone,Pisa,Modena,Fano)come calciatore, vincendo due campionati di serie c, il
Primo con il Como (2015) il secondo con il Pisa (2016).

Career
He joined Inter since 1998 from U.S. Nuovo Calcio Milano. He played few pre-season friendly matches, and made his first team debut against F.C. Messina Peloro, 29 November 2006, a Coppa Italia match.

He spent the 2007–08 season on loan to Serie C1 clubs Pro Sesto (from September to December) and Pistoiese (from January to June). In July 2008, Inter confirmed to have extended his loan to Pistoiese, also announcing the Tuscan club have an option to make the deal permanent. On July 13, 2009, Internazionale confirmed that Fautario would spend the 2009–10 season with Serie B club Grosseto on a co-ownership deal, for  a peppercorn fee of €500.

In June 2010, Inter bought him back and re-sold him to Calcio Como in another co-ownership deal, for €500. He played first 3 matches as starting left back (2 Coppa Italia and 1 at domestic league), however after sent off in the league, he was putted on the bench, as Rosario Licata's backup. That season he only made 10 starts in the league.

On 26 August 2011 he left for Frosinone as part of the deal that Diogo Tavares moved to opposite direction.

Honours
Inter youth
Campionato Nazionale Dante Berretti Runner-up: 2005

References

External links
inter.it
aic.football.it

1987 births
Living people
Italian footballers
Serie B players
Inter Milan players
U.S. Pistoiese 1921 players
S.S.D. Pro Sesto players
F.C. Grosseto S.S.D. players
Como 1907 players
Frosinone Calcio players
Pisa S.C. players
Association football defenders
Footballers from Milan